The 1904 United States presidential election in California took place on November 8, 1904 as part of the 1904 United States presidential election. State voters chose 10 representatives, or electors, to the Electoral College, who voted for president and vice president.

California voted for the Republican incumbent, Theodore Roosevelt, in a landslide over the Democratic challenger, New York judge Alton B. Parker.

Results

Results by county

Notes

References

California
1904
1904 California elections